Chase County Junior/Senior High School is a public high school in Cottonwood Falls, Kansas, United States.  It is one of two schools operated by Chase County USD 284 school district.

History
In 2010, the middle school building was closed in Strong City and the middle school moved to the existing high school building in Cottonwood Falls, thus renaming it.

Extracurricular Activities
Chase County Junior/Senior High School offers a variety of extracurricular activities for the students.

Athletics
The Bulldogs compete in the Flint Hills League and are classified as a 2A school.
A list of sports is listed below:

High School Boys
 Baseball
 Basketball
 Cross Country
 Football
 Track and Field
 Wrestling

High School Girls
 Basketball
 Cheerleading
 Cross Country
 Pom-Pon Dance Team
 Softball
 Track and Field
 Volleyball

Junior High Boys
 Basketball
 Football
 Track and Field
 Wrestling

Junior High Girls
 Basketball
 Cheerleading
 Track and Field
 Volleyball

Clubs/Organizations
Chase County Junior/Senior High School offers a variety of clubs/organizations for the students. A list of clubs offered, are listed below:

 Band
 Cheer
 FBLA
 Forensics
 KAY Club (HS)
 KAY Club (JH)
 National Honor Society
 Newspaper
 Pom-Pon
 Quill and Scroll
 Scholar's Bowl
 Spanish Club
 Student Council (HS)
 Student Council (JH)
 Technology Student Association (TSA)
 Theatre
 Voices of CCHS
 Yearbook

Notable alumni
 Ryan Kohlmeier, Former MLB player (Baltimore Orioles)

See also
 List of high schools in Kansas
 List of unified school districts in Kansas

References

External links
 Official school website
 USD 284, school district
 USD 284 School District Boundary Map, KDOT
 Cottonwood Falls City Map, KDOT

Public high schools in Kansas
Schools in Chase County, Kansas
Public middle schools in Kansas
2010 establishments in Kansas